Soul Men is an album by the R&B duo Sam & Dave, released in 1967. It reached No. 5 on the Billboard Top R&B LPs chart and No. 62 on the Top LPs chart. The album launched the hit single "Soul Man", which peaked at No. 1 on the R&B Singles chart and No. 2 on the Hot 100 Singles chart. The song won Sam & Dave a Grammy in 1967 for Best R&B Group, Vocal or Instrumental.

Track listing

Side one
"Soul Man" (Isaac Hayes, David Porter) - 2:39
"May I Baby" (Hayes, Porter) - 2:38
"Broke Down Piece of Man" (Steve Cropper, Joe Shamwell) - 2:46
"Let It Be Me" (Gilbert Bécaud, Mann Curtis, Pierre Delanoé) - 2:45
"Hold It Baby" (Bonnie "Mack" Rice) - 2:35
"I'm With You" (Lowman Pauling) - 2:50

Side two
"Don't Knock It" (Hayes, Porter) - 2:28
"Just Keep Holding On" (Alvertis Isbell, Booker T. Jones) - 2:52
"The Good Runs the Bad Away" (Wayne Jackson, Andrew Love) - 2:15
"Rich Kind of Poverty" (Hayes, Paul Selph) - 2:13
"I've Seen What Loneliness Can Do" (Homer Banks, Allen Jones) - 2:58

Personnel
Sam Moore - vocals
Dave Prater - vocals
Booker T. & the MG's and the Mar-Key Horns - instrumentation:
Booker T. Jones - keyboards
Isaac Hayes - Hammond organ
Steve Cropper - guitar
Donald Dunn - bass guitar
Al Jackson Jr. - drums
Wayne Jackson - trombone, trumpet
Charles "Packy" Axton - tenor saxophone
Don Nix - baritone saxophone
Technical
Loring Eutemey - design
Jean-Pierre Leloir - photography

References

Sam & Dave albums
1967 albums
Stax Records albums
Atlantic Records albums
Albums produced by Isaac Hayes